Stateside may refer to:
 stateside, an informal adjective or adverb meaning "in the United States"
Stateside Puerto Ricans
Stateside Virgin Islands Americans
 Stateside Records, the British record label
 Stateside (song), a 1991 song by Tin Machine
 Stateside (film), a 2004 film starring Rachael Leigh Cook
 The Troubled Stateside, a 2006 album by the Long Island band, Crime In Stereo
 Stateside (album), a 1966 Mel Tillis album (and the album's title song)
 Stateside (band), an Australian rock band